The Canton of Saint-Laurent-de-la-Salanque is a former French canton of Pyrénées-Orientales department, in Languedoc-Roussillon. It had 23,314 inhabitants (2012).

Composition 
The canton of Saint-Laurent-de-la-Salanque comprised 5 communes:
Saint-Laurent-de-la-Salanque
Le Barcarès
Claira
Saint-Hippolyte
Torreilles

References

Saint-Laurent-de-la-Salanque